Álex Márquez Alentà (born 23 April 1996) is a Grand Prix motorcycle rider from Spain racing for Ducati satellite team Gresini Racing MotoGP. He has competed in MotoGP since the 2020 season, having previously become World Champion in the 2019 Moto2 season. He also won the 2014 Moto3 World Championship, and the 2012 CEV Moto3 season's title.

Álex is the younger brother of Marc Márquez, who competes with the Honda works team in MotoGP. In 2014, when Marc won the premier class, and Álex won Moto3, they became the first pair of brothers to win world titles in motorcycle racing in the same year, a feat they would also repeat in 2019, when Marc won the premier class, and Álex won Moto2.

Career

Early career
He began the 2010 season in the CEV Buckler 125cc championship, competing with the Monlau Competición team, along with Álex Rins and Niklas Ajo. Márquez did not participate in the opening round at Circuit de Barcelona-Catalunya, as he was not old enough to do so – he did not turn fourteen until five days after the event. He finished eleventh in his first start at Albacete, having qualified tenth. He retired at Jerez due to clutch problems. He added finishes of seventh and sixth at Motorland Aragón and Albacete, before retiring from the final two races at Valencia and Jerez. He finished eleventh in the final riders' championship standings.

In 2011, Márquez battled with Rins for the title, with the championship honours ultimately going to Rins. Márquez won two races during the season – at Motorland Aragón and Albacete – and finished the season as runner-up, 12 points in arrears to Rins. With the championship changing to Moto3 regulations for the 2012 season, Márquez again won two races, at Albacete and Navarra; he won the championship with a fourth-place finish at Albacete.

Moto3 World Championship

Ambrogio Next Racing (2012)
Márquez made his world championship début as a wildcard at the 2012 Spanish Grand Prix. In difficult weather conditions, Márquez scored points with a twelfth-place finish. He also made wildcard appearances at Estoril and Catalunya, scoring points on both occasions, with fifteenth and sixth respectively. After the mid-season break, Márquez moved into the series full-time from the Indianapolis Grand Prix onwards with Ambrogio Racing, replacing Simone Grotzkyj. He scored points in four of the remaining eight races, and ultimately finished the season in twentieth place in the riders' championship.

Estrella Galicia 0,0 (2013–2014)
In 2013, the Estrella Galicia 0,0 team moved to KTM machinery, with Márquez joining Rins in the team full-time. After predominantly finishing fourth or fifth in the races during the first half of the season, Márquez achieved his first podium finish at the Indianapolis Grand Prix with a second-place finish behind Rins. Márquez recorded three consecutive third-place finishes at Silverstone, Misano and Motorland Aragón, before taking his first career victory at the Japanese Grand Prix. He finished the season in fourth position in the final championship standings.

For 2014, Márquez and Rins remained in the series and started as the championship favourites. However, in the opening third of the season, they were usurped by Ajo Motorsport rider Jack Miller, who won three of the opening five races. Márquez took successive wins in Catalunya and the Netherlands to reduce the deficit from 44 points to 7. Márquez started a run of five top-two finishes at the British Grand Prix, including another victory at Motegi, which saw him move into the championship lead ahead over Miller and open up a 25-point gap. Despite Miller winning two of the final three races, a third-place finish at the final round in Valencia saw Márquez clinch the title by two points. In the process, he and brother Marc became the first brothers to win world motorcycle racing titles.

Moto2 World Championship

EG 0,0 Marc VDS (2015–2019)

2015
For the 2015 season, Márquez moved up to the Moto2 World Championship with the Estrella Galicia 0,0 Marc VDS team and finished 14th in de standings.

2016
In 2016 Alex had a slightly better season and took his first Moto2 podium in the Aragon GP, ending the year in 13th.

2017
In 2017 was a break through year for Alex Marquez as he won his first Moto2 race at the Spanish GP, ending a much more consistent season in 4th overall,

2018
Alex was a followed up by another 4th place in 2018, despite not winning a race.

2019
Alex won the 2019 Moto2 world championship securing a double championship haul for the Marquez brothers. Alex Marquez was also the first rider to win a title in Moto3 and Moto2.

MotoGP World Championship

Repsol Honda Team (2020)
For the 2020 season, Márquez joined his brother Marc at Repsol Honda Team replacing Jorge Lorenzo who retired at the end of the 2019 MotoGP season. Márquez was unexpectedly promoted from Moto2 to MotoGP when still contracted to Marc VDS for 2020 after the retirement announcement of Lorenzo in November 2019. Moto2 contracts can be broken if the rider is offered a place in MotoGP. Márquez' old seat in Moto2 for 2020 has been taken by Spaniard Augusto Fernández.

Marquez was dropped by Repsol Honda after the 2020 season and his spot was replaced by Pol Espargaró.

LCR Honda Castrol (2021–2022)
For the 2021 season Márquez joined the LCR Honda Castrol team, partnering Nakagami. For the 2022 season, Márquez was confirmed for the LCR Team.

Gresini Racing MotoGP (from 2023)
For the 2023 MotoGP season, Alex was confirmed as a rider of the Gresini Racing MotoGP team to partner Fabio Di Giannantonio.

Career statistics

CEV Buckler Moto3 Championship

Races by year
(key) (Races in bold indicate pole position, races in italics indicate fastest lap)

Grand Prix motorcycle racing

By season

By class

Races by year
(key) (Races in bold indicate pole position; races in italics indicate fastest lap)

References

External links

 

1996 births
Living people
People from Segarra
Sportspeople from the Province of Lleida
Spanish motorcycle racers
Moto3 World Championship riders
Motorcycle racers from Catalonia
Moto2 World Championship riders
Repsol Honda MotoGP riders
MotoGP World Championship riders
LCR Team MotoGP riders
Moto2 World Riders' Champions
Moto3 World Riders' Champions